Jerry Desdunes (born 13 April 2001) is a Haitian professional footballer.

Career
Desdunes played locally with Depoze FC and Exafoot, before moving to the United States in 2018 to join the Kalonji Soccer Academy. In 2021, Desdunes played with USL League Two club Peachtree City MOBA, where he scored six goals in 14 regular season appearances. Desdunes followed this with a spell in the NISA with San Diego 1904, making 18 appearances.

On 1 February 2022, Desdunes signed with Northern Colorado Hailstorm of the USL League One ahead of their inaugural season. He debuted for the club on 6 April 2022, starting and scoring the winning goal in extra-time in a Lamar Hunt U.S. Open Cup game against Colorado Springs Switchbacks. Following the 2022 season, Northern Colorado declined his contract option.

References

2001 births
Association football defenders
Expatriate soccer players in the United States
Haitian expatriate sportspeople in the United States
Haitian expatriate footballers
Haitian footballers
Living people
National Independent Soccer Association players
Northern Colorado Hailstorm FC players
Peachtree City MOBA players
USL League One players
USL League Two players